Ulongué is a town and the administrative seat of Angónia District, situated in the north east part of the Tete Province in Mozambique.  
This town is written as Vila Ulongué in some maps, but the name of this town is Ulongué not Vila Ulongué.

The IMAP (teacher's training college), Escola Secundária de Ulongué (secondary school), numerous primary schools, churches, Mozambique Trading Company, Mozambique Leaf Tobacco, and GPZ all have a presence in the area.

Demographics

References

Angónia District
Populated places in Tete Province